Subhrajit Dutta is an Indian film and theatre actor who appears in Bengali films and television serials. Some of the notable Bengali films he acted in include Ebar Shabor, Manojder Adbhut Bari, Eagoler Chokh, Double Feluda.

Career

Theatre career 
Dutta started his acting career as an actor in Bengali theatre. He first acted in a Bengali drama when he was in class VI. Later Dutta and some of his friends started a theatre group "Arkaj". His first major role as a theatre actor was in the drama Angshumati, directed by Ramaprasad Banik for the theatre group Purba Paschim. Later he acted in several other dramas such as Haripada Haribol of Chetana, Raktakarabi, directed by Goutam Halder, Nashtanir etc.

Film and television career 
Dutta acted in several Bengali television serials such as Ekdin Pratidin (2005–2007), Ekhane Akash Neel (2008–2009), Bokul Kotha. In Bokul Kotha, he played the character of Rohan. He also acted in a 200-episode long television serial Bhumi Konnya, directed by Arindam Sil. He played the role of Deshbandhu Chittaranjan Das in Netaji which aired on GEC Zee Bangla.

He also acted in a webseries Gogoler Kirti  where he played the role of Gogol's father. 

He is currently playing the negative role of Prasoon Bose in the serial Gaatchora airing on Star Jalsha.

Filmography 
 Tirandaj Shabor (2022)
 Professor Shonku O El Dorado (2019)
 Mitin Mashi (2019)
 Manojder Adbhut Bari (2018)
 Reunion (2018)
 Asche Abar Shabor (2018)
 Double Feluda (2016)
 Chitrakar (2016)
 Eagoler Chokh  (2016)
 Ebar Shabor (2015)
 Buno Haansh (2014)
 Chaar (2014)
 Shaada Kalo Aabcha (2013)
 Jekhane Bhooter Bhoy (2012)
 Ami Mantri Habo (2011)

References

External links 
 

Living people
Male actors from Kolkata
Bengali male actors
Year of birth missing (living people)